Brigadier Roderick "Rory" Muir Bamford Walker OBE MC (27 February 1932 – 15 October 2008) was a British SAS Commander, best known for his heroism during the Oman Uprising and the Indonesian Confrontation. He is also well remembered as a skilled bagpipe player.

Early life and training
Walker was born 27 February 1932 in Sutton Coldfield, the son of Roderick Noel Duncan Walker, a solicitor, and his wife Doris Margaret Walker (née Greensill). He grew up at the family home on Green Lanes, Wylde Green and was educated at Cheltenham College and RMA Sandhurst

Career
Walker was commissioned into the Sherwood Foresters in 1952, where he served for a short period before being transferred to the Intelligence Corps, from there he joined 22 Special Air Service Regiment as a Troop Commander. Early in his career he made his name as an Army Officers Boxing Champion and an expert parachutist.

The Oman Campaign

The kingdom of Muscat and Oman had been a British Protectorate since 1891 and by the 1950s was ruled by Sultan Said bin Taimur, who by the late 1950s was facing serious opposition and uprisings from the imam of Oman. Britain helped Taimur to suppress the imam's first revolt in 1955, however this caused resentment from Saudi Arabia and Egypt who then backed the imam's second revolt in 1958.

Britain responded to the second uprising by reassigning D Squadron 22 SAS under the command of Major John Watts from Malaysia to deal with the situation in Oman. Watts was accompanied by Captain Walker.

After the rebellion was 'put down' the leaders fled into Jebel Akhdar (The Green Mountain) and continued to launch intermittent attacks from their safe vantage point.  Walker was then sent in command of two groups to deal with the rebels. On 27 December, Walker gained a lodgment on the north side of the Jebel and climbed a rope which they had fixed to the rock face, steadying himself in a cleft in the rock, Walker pulled the pin from a grenade and hurled it over the lip above him. It killed one of the enemy and scattered the rest. Walker and his men then reached the plateau and by dawn they had killed another eight. Walker was later awarded the Military Cross for his bravery.

The Indonesian Confrontation

By the 1960s, Walker, by then a Major had been assigned to serve under Lieutenant Colonel Bill Becke as a member of the two-man Military Attaché at the British Embassy in Djakarta, Indonesia.

During his posting the Indonesia–Malaysia confrontation began, when Britain as part of the dismantling of the Empire in Southeast Asia, proposed to combine its colonies on Borneo with the Federation of Malaya to form a new country called Malaysia. The move was opposed by neighbouring country of Indonesia, who believed that it was a ploy to increase British control over the region and would eventually threaten their independence.

On 16 September 1963, an organised mob of several thousand demonstrators formed in the city of Djakarta, they sacked the Malaysian Embassy before marching on the British Embassy where Becke and Walker were on guard, they tore down the Union Jack and burnt the Ambassadors car, then threw stones and pieces of concrete through the fence breaking all the embassy windows. In what is now a legendary act Walker strode up and down in front of the building, dodging the missiles and relentlessly playing his bagpipes despite pleas from the police and the leader of the demonstrators, eventually the mob broke up and the battle was won.

Two days later however the mob returned and broke through the fence besieging the building and eventually setting it on fire, Becke, Walker and the Ambassador Sir Andrew Gilchrist bravely stood their ground taking a stand on British sovereign soil and defending the embassy strong room.

Later career
Walker later went on to command 23 SAS (TAVR) a service involving him in training potential "stay-behind" parties in northwest Europe in the event of a Warsaw Pact attack. He was appointed OBE on conclusion of his command. He returned to intelligence work and after promotion to brigadier became a deputy commander of a military district in England, before being promoted to Security Chief for the Army North of the Border, during this time he was convinced that Soviet Union Spetznaz operatives had carried out detailed reconnaissance of targets in Scotland in the guise of long-distance drivers.

Personal life
In March 1979, Walker married Susette Mary Aitchison and they raised two sons; Duncan Stewart Aitchison and Roderick James Craw at their home in the village of Dunning, Strathearn, Scotland, their second son Angus John Roderick had died in infancy.

During his life Walker was active in the Royal Scottish Pipers Society and was a noted fundraiser for the Scottish Cot Death Trust.

Death
Brigadier Walker died peacefully on 15 October 2008 at the age of 76 after a long illness. His funeral took place at Dunning Parish Church on 26 October 2008.

References

1932 births
2008 deaths
People educated at Cheltenham College
Graduates of the Royal Military Academy Sandhurst
Sherwood Foresters officers
Special Air Service officers
Officers of the Order of the British Empire
Recipients of the Military Cross
Intelligence Corps officers
Great Highland bagpipe players
People from Sutton Coldfield
British Army personnel of the Indonesia–Malaysia confrontation
British military attachés
British Army brigadiers
Military personnel from Warwickshire